The Central District of Kamyaran County is a district (bakhsh) in Kamyaran County, Kurdistan Province, Iran. At the 2006 census, its population was 73,820, in 17,569 families.  The District has one city: Kamyaran. The District has three rural districts (dehestan): Bilavar Rural District, Shahu Rural District, and Zhavehrud Rural District.

References 

Kamyaran County
Districts of Kurdistan Province